Francesca Jones may refer to:

 Frankie Jones (gymnast) (born 1990), Welsh rhythmic gymnast
 Francesca Jones (tennis) (born 2000), British tennis player